Saltoro Kangri, formerly known as Peak 36, is the highest peak of the Saltoro Mountains subrange of Karakoram range, also known as the Saltoro Range, which is a part of the Karakoram. Saltoro Kangri is a name generally used for the twin peaks, Saltoro Kangri I (to the south) and Saltoro Kangri II, connected by a saddle. While comparing the heights the generic term Saltoro Kangri is applied to the higher peak, Saltoro Kangri I, which is the 31st highest mountain in the world in remote reaches of Karokaram. It is located on Indian side of the Actual Ground Position Line between Indian controlled territory in the Siachen region and Pakistani controlled territory west of the Saltoro Range.

Climbing history 
The mountain was reconnoitered by the Fanny Bullock Workman and her husband in 1911–12. The first attempt on the peak (then still called "Peak 36") was in 1935 by a British expedition led by James Waller and John Hunt. Hunt had been suggested to Waller by the Himalayan Club in Calcutta; also in the party were Rowland Brotherhood and Dr. Steward Carslaw, besides two Sherpas, Palden and Dawa Thondup. They approached the mountain from the Likah Glacier, hoping to climb the South East ridge, and established a final camp on 19 June, but overestimated their altitude. A summit attempt the next day proved too far: they had to climb 3500 feet in deteriorating weather. Hunt and Brotherhood reached 24,500 feet but then had to turn around.

A British university expedition led by Eric Shipton approached the peak through the Bilafond La via Pakistan with a Pakistani climbing permit, but did not attempt to summit. This expedition was inadvertently the first move in the deadly game of Siachen oropolitics that would lead to the Siachen conflict of 1984.

The first ascent of Saltoro Kangri was in July 1962, by a joint Japanese-Pakistani expedition led by T. Shidei. This piggyback expedition put A. Saito, Y. Takamura and Pakistani climber R.A. Bashir on the top on July 24, following the S.E. ridge route. The peak was again climbed by an Indian Army expedition led by Colonel Narendra Kumar in 1981. US maps of the area and many world atlases starting in the 1960s showed the Line of Control between Pakistani and Indian territory running from the last defined point in the 1949 Karachi Agreement, NJ9842, east-northeast to the Karakoram Pass, thus putting the whole of Saltoro Kangri and the entire Siachen Glacier in Pakistan.  However, the Simla Agreement defined the Line of Control no further than point NJ9842 other than with the phrase "thence north to the glaciers." The Himalayan Index lists only one more ascent of the mountain, in 1981, and no other attempts.

References

Further reading 
 Jill Neate, High Asia: An Illustrated History of the 7000 Metre Peaks,

External links 
 "Saltoro Kangri, India/Pakistan" on Peakbagger

Borders of Pakistan
Mountains of Ladakh
Seven-thousanders of the Karakoram
Mountains of Gilgit-Baltistan